Cedar Grove-Belgium High School is a public high school located in Cedar Grove, Wisconsin, United States. It serves grades 9-12 and is part of the Cedar Grove-Belgium School District. Cedar Grove-Belgium High School has 322 students.

Athletics
Cedar Grove-Belgium High School participates in athletics as a member of the Big East Conference. Their athletic teams are known as the Rockets. The Rockets went to the State Division 5 Football Championship in 2008 and in their 2016 season, and lost 38-35.

References

External links

Greatschools.net - Cedar Grove-Belgium High School

Public high schools in Wisconsin
Schools in Sheboygan County, Wisconsin